100P/Hartley, also known as Hartley 1, is a periodic, Jupiter family comet in the Solar System.

On 29 April 2164 the comet will pass  from Earth.

References

External links 
 100P/Hartley 1 – Seiichi Yoshida @ aerith.net
 100P at Kronk's Cometography
 

Periodic comets
0100
Discoveries by Malcolm Hartley
Comets in 2016
19850613